Quasipaa shini (common names: spiny-flanked frog, Chinese paa frog) is a species of frog in the family Dicroglossidae. It is endemic to southern central China (Guangxi, Guizhou, Hunan, and Chongqing). Its natural habitats are rivers in subtropical moist lowland forests and montane forest at elevations of  asl. It is threatened by over-collecting for human consumption and by habitat loss.

Quasipaa shini are relatively large frogs.

Its specific name shini ("of Shin" in Latin) honours the biology professor . The German zoologist Ernst Ahl, who named the species, also named the lizard Shinisaurus after professor Sin.

References

shini
Amphibians of China
Endemic fauna of China
Taxonomy articles created by Polbot
Amphibians described in 1930